Ceratothoa steindachneri is an ectoparasite known as a tongue biter. It parasitises fish by attaching to the tongue, causing atrophy. It then replaces the tongue.

Description
C. steindachneri has a oval to rounded body and is generally stocky. It is tan or ivory coloured, with considerable sexual dimorphism in this species, with females (15-23 mm) being much larger than males (4.8-5.3 mm). Females are also more rotund, males are more stocky and rectangular.

Distribution
C. steindachneri is found in the northern Atlantic Ocean and the Mediterranean Sea.  It was first found in British waters at Whitsand Bay, Cornwall, in 1996 in the lesser weever fish. It has since be found all around the coast of Britain.

Host species
It is a generalist species that can parasitise a wide range of fish species, including the shortnose greeneye (Chlorophthalmus agassizi), lesser weever fish (Echiichthys vipera), red porgy (Pagrus pagrus), comber (Serranus cabrilla), painted comber (Serranus scriba), brown comber (Serranus hepatus), annular seabream (Diplodus annularis), and common two-banded sea bream (Diplodus vulgaris).

C. steindachneri has also been reported on Raja asterias, R. polystigma, and R. albas, but these records are yet to be confirmed, as they are most likely the result of trawl transfers.

References

Cymothoida
Animal parasites of fish
Ectoparasites
Crustaceans described in 1879
Crustaceans of the Atlantic Ocean
Parasitic crustaceans